Myriopteris aurea, the golden lip fern or Bonaire lip fern, is a moderately-sized fern native to the Americas, a member of the family Pteridaceae. Unlike many members of its genus, its leaf is only modestly dissected into lobed leaflets (pinnae), which are hairy both above and below. One of the cheilanthoid ferns, until 2013 it was classified in the genus Cheilanthes as Cheilanthes bonariensis, when the genus Myriopteris was again recognized as separate from Cheilanthes. It typically grows on dry, rocky slopes, and ranges from Mexico, where it is common and widespread, and the southwestern United States south and east through Central and South America as far as Chile and Argentina.

Description
The rhizome bears scales, which are linear to lanceolate, with untoothed or very slightly toothed margins. They are slightly twisted and strongly pressed against the rhizome.

The fronds spring up in clusters; unlike many ferns, they do not unfold as fiddleheads (noncircinate vernation). The upper surface of the stipe is rounded and not grooved. The stipe is shiny, dark chestnut brown to black or purplish-black in color.

The leaf blades are linear to lanceolate or elliptical, and pinnate-pinnatifid (cut into deeply lobed pinnae), much less dissected than most Myriopteris species. The rachis (leaf axis) is densely covered in pubescent hairs, but lacks scales. From 15 to 44 pairs of pinnae are present, attached directly to the rachis or with a short stalk. Each pinna is approximately equilateral in shape, has from 3 to 8 pairs of lobes, which may be cut as shallowly as one-fourth or as deeply as three-fourths of the distance to the costa (pinna axis). The number of lobes and deepness of cutting can vary a great deal between individuals. They are joined to the rachis by a distinct stalk; the dark color of the rachis extends into the stalk but terminates abruptly in a swollen node covered with hairs. The lowest pair of pinnae is slightly smaller than the one above. At the other end of the frond, the pinnae gradually taper to an acute or obtuse apex. The leaf tissue is parchment-like to almost leathery. They are pale golden-tan in color. The lower surface of the pinnae is also covered in hairs, matted so thickly as to hide the leaf tissue, which vary from white, particularly when young, to rusty red in color. They do not curl up when dried out.

On fertile fronds, the sori are located at the ends of veins near the margin of the leaf, forming a more or less continuous zone adjacent to the margin, which curls back slightly but does not form a distinct false indusium to protect them. It is somewhat thinner and more delicate than the rest of the leaf tissue, though not quite hyaline. Each sporangium contains 32 dark brown to black spores. The vast majority of M. aurea individuals thus far examined are apogamous triploids, with a chromosome number of 90 present in both sporophyte and gametophyte. A few populations forming 64 spores per sporangium have reportedly been found, and are presumed to be sexual diploids.

Among its congeners M. aurea is most similar to M. yatskievychiana, known only from Sonora which is smaller and has dense white (rather than rusty) hairs on the underside of the leaf. The pinnate-pinnatifid leaf blades distinguish these two species from the rest of the genus, the other species being more highly dissected. M. aurea superficially resembles some species of Astrolepis, such as [[Astrolepis sinuata|A. sinuata]], which have short, deeply lobed pinnae, but they bear the stellate scales that give their genus its name rather than the hairs seen on M. aurea. In the southern part of its range, it might be confused with Cheilanthes fraseri, but the latter has leaves widely spaced along the rhizome, pinnae more or less triangular (rather than equilateral), and rhizome scales light brown at the apex, rather than dark brown.

Taxonomy
The species was first described as Pteris aurea by Jean Louis Marie Poiret in Lamarck's Encyclopédie Méthodique, Botanique in 1804. He based his description on a specimen collected in Peru by Joseph de Jussieu. The specific epithet aurea, meaning "golden", evidently refers to the "yellow, almost golden" hairs covering the upper surface of the leaves.

In 1810, Carl Ludwig Willdenow recognized Pteris aurea in the 5th edition of Species Plantarum, but also described a new species, Acrostichum bonariense, based on material collected near Buenos Aires (Latinized as "Bonaria"), an illustration of which was published by Johann Amman in 1738. Willdenow evidently did not have access to any of Amman's material, and so failed to recognize the similarity between Amman's fern and Pteris aurea. Confusion was compounded in 1822, when Heinrich Friedrich Link described the species yet again, based on a Humboldt and Bonpland specimen which Willdenow had labeled Cheilanthes ferruginea but had omitted from Species Plantarum. The specific epithet ferruginea means "rusty-reddish", perhaps referring to the color of the hairs below, so described by Willdenow for A. bonariense.

In his Reliquae Haenkeanae in 1825, Carl Borivoj Presl recognized that A. bonariensis and C. ferruginea were the same species, but (illegitimately) invented the new name of Notholaena rufa to encompass both. Placement in Notholaena reflected the placement of the sori at or near the margin of the leaf, combined with an absence of a distinct false indusium formed by that margin. The specific epithet rufa, meaning "reddish", corresponds to his description of the color of hairs on both sides of the leaf. Unfortunately, Presl also included the farinose N. ferruginea (Desv.) Desv. and N. tomentosa Desv. (now considered N. trichomanoides and C. hypoleuca, respectively) within his concept of the species. He distinguished between var. minor of the species, with dense hairs on the upper surface, and var. major, with sparse hairs on the upper surface. Meanwhile, Nicaise Auguste Desvaux also recognized Notholaena, and transferred P. aurea there as N. aurea in 1827. Christian Nees von Esenbeck transferred C. ferruginea to Pellaea as P. ferruginea in 1847, but this was not widely followed.

William Jackson Hooker transferred C. ferruginea to Notholaena in his Species Filicum in 1864, and recognized the distinctness of N. trichomanoides, but his use of the name N. ferruginea was illegitimate as it had already been used by Desvaux, and he failed to recognize N. tomentosa as a distinct species. Hooker's re-use of N. ferruginea for this species led to continued confusion with N. trichomanoides. In 1906 Carl Christensen transferred the more senior A. bonariensis to Notholaena as Notholaena bonariensis, but recognized both N. ferruginea (Desv.) Desv. and N. tomentosa as synonyms. This confusion appears to have led José N. Rovirosa to found another name for the species, Notholaena chiapensis, named for one of his collections in Chiapas; he noted that it was non-farinose, and thought that Hooker's name applied to the farinose species (i.e., N. trichomanoides). It was not until 1939 that Charles Alfred Weatherby, who was looking for type specimens in Desvaux's collections at the Paris herbarium, identified Notholaena aurea as the most senior name for the species in that genus and unraveled the erroneous synonymies.

In 1953, George R. Proctor transferred the species to Cheilanthes as Cheilanthes bonariensis, since the name Cheilanthes aurea was preoccupied. However, most authors continued to place it in Notholaena. One of these was Rolla M. Tryon Jr. who, in 1956, published a revision of American Notholaena incorporating material from Weatherby, who had died in 1949. Tryon accepted the species in Notholaena as N. aurea, and circumscribed it in the fashion presently accepted (including A. bonariensis, C. ferruginea, and N. chiapensis, and excluding N. ferruginea (Desv.) Desv. and N. tomentosa Desv.). He accepted as the type of A. bonariensis a specimen seen by Weatherby in Willdenow's herbarium in Berlin.

Tryon noted that the generic delimitation of Notholaena and Cheilanthes, based on the traditional criterion that the latter had leaf edges curled under and modified into distinct false indusia while the former did not, was unsatisfactory, given the existence of many intermediate forms. In 1982, he and his wife Alice published an extended survey of the ferns in which they narrowed the circumscription of Notholaena, treating N. aurea as C. bonariensis. This classification was widely taken up by other workers. Research at the Berlin herbarium subsequently revealed that the specimen in Willdenow's herbarium came from Mexico, and did not match his original description, registering it ineligible as a type. In 2011, M. Mónica Ponce and Brigitte Zimmer designated Amman's illustration as the lectotype of A. bonariense; as there was some question as to whether the drawing represented C. bonariensis in the conventional sense or Cheilanthes buchtienii, they further designated Willdenow's Mexican specimen as an epitype.

Meanwhile, the development of molecular phylogenetic methods showed that the traditional circumscription of Cheilanthes is polyphyletic. Convergent evolution in arid environments is thought to be responsible for widespread homoplasy in the morphological characters traditionally used to classify it and the segregate genera that have sometimes been recognized. On the basis of molecular evidence, Amanda Grusz and Michael D. Windham revived the genus Myriopteris in 2013 for a group of species formerly placed in Cheilanthes. One of these was C. bonariensis; since the epithet aurea was not preoccupied, they transferred P. aurea to the genus to become Myriopteris aurea. In 2018, Maarten J. M. Christenhusz transferred the species to Hemionitis as H. bonariensis (H. aurea being preoccupied), as part of a program to consolidate the cheilanthoid ferns into that genus.

Further molecular studies in Myriopteris demonstrated the existence of three well-supported clades within the genus. M. aurea belongs to what Grusz et al. informally named the covillei clade. M. aurea and the similar M. yatskievychiana are sister to the rest of the clade; all other members of the clade, except M. newberryi, belong to the "core covillei" clade, with leaves finely divided into bead-like segments, quite dissimilar to M. aurea.

The common names golden lip fern and Bonaire lip fern refer to the epithets bestowed by Poiret and Willdenow, respectively. "Lip fern" comes from the position of the sporangia at the edge or lip of the leaf, typical of the genus.  Lellinger, who referred to the species as N. aurea, called it golden cloak fern; "cloak fern" refers to the reflexed leaf margins of Notholaena, curled back on the sporangia. It has also been called slender cloak fern.

Distribution and habitatMyriopteris aurea grows throughout Mexico except for Tabasco and the Yucatan Peninsula, where it is the most widespread and abundant fern in the country. The range extends slightly north into the United States, into Arizona, New Mexico, and Trans-Pecos Texas. In the east, it is found among the Greater Antilles and in Venezuela. To the south, it extends through Central America into South America and along the Andes Mountains, where it has been described as "one of the characteristic ferns of the Altiplano", as far south as Chile and Argentina, and east into Brazil, Paraguay and Uruguay.

The species grows on dry, rocky slopes, and cliffs, soil banks, and shrubby hillsides. It tolerates a variety of different rocks, although it is comparatively uncommon on limestone.

Ecology and conservation
The species is globally secure. NatureServe does not assign conservation rankings for the three states of the United States at the northern edge of its range.

Uses and cultivationMyriopteris aurea'' can be grown on moist-dry to dry garden soil, supplemented with sand. The soil must be well-drained and it requires high levels of light. The horticulturist George Schneider, writing in 1892, spoke of it as "an old inhabitant of our gardens".

Edward Palmer collected a specimen at the market in Saltillo in 1898, where he reported that a decoction was prepared from it and drunk to treat "pain in the stomach" and "coughs".

Notes and references

References

Works cited

External links

aurea
Ferns of the Americas
Ferns of Mexico
Ferns of the United States
Plants described in 1804